Amphibolurus burnsi, Burn's dragon, is a species of agama found in Australia.

References

External Links

Amphibolurus
Agamid lizards of Australia
Taxa named by Richard Walter Wells
Taxa named by Cliff Ross Wellington
Reptiles described in 1985